Buffalo-Lancaster Regional Airport  is a privately owned, public use airport in Erie County, New York, United States. It is located three nautical miles (6 km) northeast of the central business district of Lancaster, a village in the Town of Lancaster, east of Buffalo.

Although many U.S. airports use the same three-letter location identifier for the FAA and IATA, this airport is assigned BQR by the FAA but has no designation from the IATA.

The airport is also an emergency landing site for Buffalo Niagara International Airport (handling smaller aircraft).

Facilities and aircraft
It has one asphalt paved runway designated 8/26 which measures .

The airport is the primary-reliever of the Buffalo Niagara International Airport.

For the 12-month period ending July 17, 2006, the airport had 30,000 general aviation aircraft operations, an average of 82 per day. At that time there were 37 aircraft based at this airport: 95% single-engine and 5% multi-engine.

References

External links

 at New York State DOT airport directory 

Airports in New York (state)
Transportation buildings and structures in Buffalo, New York